Loren Oldenburg (born September 8, 1965) is an American dairy farmer and politician, currently serving in the Wisconsin State Assembly, representing Vernon County, Crawford County, and the southern half of Monroe County.  A Republican, he was first elected in 2018.

Biography
Oldenburg was born in Viroqua, Vernon County, Wisconsin.  A fourth generation farmer, he was raised and still resides on a 315-acre farm in Vernon County passed down from his great grandfather.  Oldenburg graduated from Viroqua High School in 1984 and the University of Wisconsin–La Crosse.

He was active within his community, as a member and president of the Westby Cooperative Creamery, and, for the last 19 years, as a member and president of the Chaseburg Cenex Cooperative.  He was elected to the Town Board of Harmony, Vernon County, and served as the Town Board Chairman.

He ran for the Wisconsin State Assembly in 2018, announcing his campaign just days after incumbent Lee Nerison announced his retirement.  He was unopposed in the Republican primary and won a narrow victory over Democrat Paul Buhr in the November general election, carrying 52% of the vote.

In the Assembly, Oldenburg serves on the Committees on Consumer Protection, Energy and Utilities, Rural Development, and Workforce Development, and is Vice Chairman of the Committee on the Environment.  He was also appointed to the Speaker's Task Force on Suicide Prevention, an issue that has become prominent in rural Wisconsin due to the increasing number of farm bankruptcies.

Personal life and family
Oldenburg and his wife, Linda, reside and own the Oldenburg Centennial Farms in Vernon County, Wisconsin.  They are members of the Viroqua Church of Christ.

Electoral history

| colspan="6" style="text-align:center;background-color: #e9e9e9;"| Republican Primary Election, August 14, 2018

| colspan="6" style="text-align:center;background-color: #e9e9e9;"| General Election, November 6, 2018

References

External links
 Loren Oldenburg: Oldenburg for Assembly
 Representative Loren Oldenburg at Wisconsin Legislature
 
 
 Chaseburg Cooperative

1965 births
Living people
University of Wisconsin–La Crosse alumni
People from Viroqua, Wisconsin
Businesspeople from Wisconsin
Farmers from Wisconsin
Wisconsin city council members
Republican Party members of the Wisconsin State Assembly
21st-century American politicians